Edward M. and Della C. Wilhoit House is a historic home located at Springfield, Greene County, Missouri. It was built in 1916, and is a -story, rectangular Georgian Revival style brick dwelling.  It features a one-story gabled-roof portico with a
triangular pediment supported by limestone pilasters and columns with Tuscan order capitals and a sun porch.  Also on the property is he contributing one-story, three-bay brick garage.  It was built by Edward M. Wilhoit, who also built the E. M. Wilhoit Building.

It was listed on the National Register of Historic Places in 2004.

References

Houses on the National Register of Historic Places in Missouri
Georgian Revival architecture in Missouri
Houses completed in 1916
Buildings and structures in Springfield, Missouri
National Register of Historic Places in Greene County, Missouri